Hykeham is a southern suburb of Lincoln, Lincolnshire in England.

It is served by Hykeham railway station.

Areas of Lincoln, England